The 1931 Wisconsin Badgers football team was an American football team that represented the University of Wisconsin in the 1931 Big Ten Conference football season. The team compiled a 5–4–1 record (3–3 against conference opponents), finished in sixth place in the Big Ten Conference, and was outscored by all opponents by a combined total of 110 to 104. Glenn Thistlethwaite was in his fifth and final year as Wisconsin's head coach.

Guard Greg Kabat was selected by the Associated Press (AP) and Central Press (CP) as a third-team player on the 1931 College Football All-America Team, and by the AP and the Big Ten team captains as a first-team player on the 1931 All-Big Ten Conference football team.

Tackle Harold Smith was selected as the team's most valuable player. Smith was also the team captain.

The team played its home games at Camp Randall Stadium, which had a capacity of 38,293. During the 1931 season, the average attendance at home games was 15,068.

Schedule

References

Wisconsin
Wisconsin Badgers football seasons
Wisconsin Badgers football